Torquay was a county constituency in Devon, South West England, which returned one Member of Parliament to the House of Commons of the Parliament of the United Kingdom.

It was created for the 1885 general election and abolished for the February 1974 general election. The area it represented became part of the Torbay constituency.

Boundaries 
1885–1918: The Borough of Dartmouth and the Sessional Division of Paignton.

1918–1950: The Boroughs of Dartmouth and Torquay, the Urban Districts of Brixham and Paignton, the parishes of Churston Ferrers, Kingswear, Marldon, and Stoke Gabriel in the Rural District of Totnes, and the parishes of Cockington and Stokeinteignhead in the Rural District of Newton Abbot.

1950–1974: The Borough of Torquay, the Urban Districts of Brixham and Paignton, and the parishes of Churston Ferrers and Kingswear in the Rural District of Totnes.

Members of Parliament

Election results

Elections in the 1880s

Elections in the 1890s

Elections in the 1900s

Elections in the 1910s 

General Election 1914–15:

Another General Election was required to take place before the end of 1915. The political parties had been making preparations for an election to take place and by the July 1914, the following candidates had been selected; 
Unionist: Charles Burn
Liberal: Thomas Devereux Pile

Elections in the 1920s

Elections in the 1930s

Election in the 1940s 
General Election 1939–40:
Another General Election was required to take place before the end of 1940. The political parties had been making preparations for an election to take place from 1939 and by the end of this year, the following candidates had been selected; 
Conservative: Charles Williams 
Liberal: Hugo Keene 
Labour: W W Blaylock

Elections in the 1950s

Elections in the 1960s

Election in the 1970s

References

 
 Craig, F. W. S. (1983). British parliamentary election results 1918–1949 (3 ed.). Chichester: Parliamentary Research Services. .

Parliamentary constituencies in Devon (historic)
Constituencies of the Parliament of the United Kingdom established in 1885
Constituencies of the Parliament of the United Kingdom disestablished in 1974
Torquay